Predrag Valenčić (born 2 October 1963) is a Croatian retired football player.

Career
Born in Rijeka, as a player he spent much of his career with HNK Rijeka, where he collected over 100 caps and scored 14 goals in the Yugoslav First League from 1984 to 1989 and 1990-1991. He played against Standard Liège in the 1986-87 UEFA Cup and in the 1986-87 Yugoslav Cup final against Hajduk Split.

Career statistics

References

1963 births
Living people
Footballers from Rijeka
Association football midfielders
Yugoslav footballers
Croatian footballers
HNK Rijeka players
HNK Orijent players
Yugoslav First League players